Manolo Cadenas Montañés (born 20 May 1955) is a Spain-born handball coach of the Argentina men's national handball team.

References

1955 births
Living people
Spanish handball coaches
Sportspeople from the Province of León
Spanish expatriate sportspeople in Poland
Spanish expatriate sportspeople in Argentina
Spanish expatriate sportspeople in Belarus
Handball coaches of international teams